The Birghorn is a mountain of the Bernese Alps, located on the border between the Swiss cantons of Bern and Valais. It lies on the range connecting the Lötschen Pass from the Tschingelhorn, separating the upper Gasterntal (Bernese Oberland) from the Lötschental (Valais).

References

External links
 Birghorn on Hikr

Bernese Alps
Mountains of the Alps
Alpine three-thousanders
Mountains of Switzerland
Mountains of Valais
Mountains of the canton of Bern
Bern–Valais border